Kahriz Siyah Mansur (also Romanized as Kahrīz Sīyāh Mansūr and Kahrīz Sīāh Mansūr; also known as Kahrīz and Nahrīz) is a village in Ijrud-e Pain Rural District, Halab District, Ijrud County, Zanjan Province, Iran. At the 2006 census, its population was 150, in 37 families.

References 

Populated places in Ijrud County